Konstantin Valerievich Rudenko (born 23 July 1981) is a former Kazakhstani-Russian professional ice hockey winger who played in the Russian Superleague and Kontinental Hockey League (KHL). He was selected by the Philadelphia Flyers in the 6th round (160th overall) of the 1999 NHL Entry Draft.

Playing career
Rudenko has spent 13 seasons playing in Russia. After his initial season with SKA Saint Petersburg in 1999-2000, where he posted one goal and one assist in 20 games, Rudenko joined with Lokomotiv Yaroslavl. The winger spent 11 seasons with the team registering 64 goals and 96 assists in 350 games for club, as he was part of the 2002 and 2003 Russian Superleague Championship teams.

Luckily for Rudenko, he signed with Atlant Moscow Oblast in July 2011, two months before the 2011 Lokomotiv Yaroslavl plane crash. In his lone season with Atlant, Rudenko had five goals and six assists in 35 contests. In July 2012 he signed a contract with Barys Astana.

Career statistics

References

External links

1981 births
Living people
Sportspeople from Oskemen
Russian ice hockey left wingers
Kazakhstani ice hockey players
SKA Saint Petersburg players
Philadelphia Flyers draft picks
Lokomotiv Yaroslavl players
Atlant Moscow Oblast players
Barys Nur-Sultan players